A concurrent was the weekday of 24 March in the Julian calendar counted from , regarding  as Sunday. It was used to calculate the Julian Easter during the Middle Ages. Therefore, the following  was a Sunday and the following   [ ] was also a Sunday. It was first mentioned by Dionysius Exiguus in 525 in his Latin version of the original Alexandrian Church's Greek computus. The insertion of the sixth epagomenal day  immediately before  was compensated for by the bissextile day  inserted six months later into the Julian calendar.

The widely used post-Bedan solar cycle (first year 776), which repeats every 28years, had concurrents of 
1 2 3 4 6 7 1
2 4 5 6 7 2 3
4 5 7 1 2 3 5
6 7 1 3 4 5 6. 
It skips a concurrent every four years due to a bissextile day in the Julian calendar a month earlier. The Sunday after the next  was Easter Sunday (see Computus#Julian calendar). The concurrent is not used by the Gregorian Easter.

References

Easter date
Julian calendar